Zdravkov is a surname. Notable people with the surname include:

Antoni Zdravkov (born 1964), Bulgarian footballer
Gordan Zdravkov (born 1959), Macedonian footballer
Ivan Zdravkov (born 1991), Bulgarian footballer
Toma Zdravkov (born 187), Bulgarian singer
Radoslav Zdravkov (1956), Bulgarian footballer
Zdravko Zdravkov (born 1970), Bulgarian footballer

See also
Georgi Zdravkov Sarmov (born 1985), Bulgarian footballer

Bulgarian-language surnames